Tibor Gosztola (born 29 May 1961) is a Hungarian sports shooter. He competed in the mixed skeet event at the 1980 Summer Olympics.

References

1961 births
Living people
Hungarian male sport shooters
Olympic shooters of Hungary
Shooters at the 1980 Summer Olympics
Sport shooters from Budapest